The discography of Canadian country music artist Carroll Baker consists of 14 studio albums, four compilation albums, and 56 singles. Between 1970 and 1992, Baker charted 53 songs on the RPM Country Tracks chart in Canada, including 14 number one hits.

Albums

Studio albums

Compilation albums

Singles

1970s

1980s and 1990s

As featured artist

References

Discographies of Canadian artists
Country music discographies